The regions of the Netherlands provides links to both regions and subregions of the Netherlands.

Regions

The regions of the Netherlands are divided in the North, South, West and East Netherlands.

Official regions

Many regions in the Netherlands are officially defined by certain regulations of organizations.

First level NUTS of the European Union

NUTS-1 Regional divisions as used by the European Union:

 Region NL1 (North Netherlands): Groningen, Friesland, Drenthe
 Region NL2 (East Netherlands): Overijssel, Gelderland, Flevoland
 Region NL3 (West Netherlands): Utrecht, North Holland, South Holland, Zeeland
 Region NL4 (South Netherlands): North Brabant, Limburg

Unofficial multi-country regions

De Duffelt
Euregio Enschede-Gronau
Euregio Benelux Middengebied
Ems Dollart Region
Frisia
Kempen
Maasland
Meuse-Rhine Euroregion
Rhine-Meuse-North Euroregion
Rhine-Waal Euroregion
Scheldemond Euroregion

Unofficial multi-province regions

Bible Belt
De Biesbosch
Bollenstreek
Gelderse Vallei
Groene Hart
Holland
Hondsrug
Peel
Rijnland
Rivierengebied
Schelde- en Maasdelta
Utrecht Hill Ridge
Vechtstreek
Vijfheerenlanden
West Frisian Islands

Inter-province metropolitan areas

Randstad (North Holland, South Holland, Utrecht and Flevoland)
Stadsregio Arnhem Nijmegen (Gelderland and Limburg)

Subregions

The subregions (Dutch: landstreek (plural: landstreken), literally translating to a combination of 'land/country area/region') are non-administrative area in the Netherlands that can be demarcated on grounds of cohesion with regards to culture or landscape. This means that a landstreek is not bound by provincial or municipal boundaries. Below is a list of all Dutch landstreken with the province(s) in which they are located mentioned between brackets.

A

Achterhoek (Gelderland)
Alblasserwaard (South Holland)
Ameland (Friesland)
Amstelland (North Holland)
Amsterdam Metropolitan Area (North Holland)

B
Baronie van Breda (North Brabant)
Beemster (North Holland)
Beijerland (South Holland)
Betuwe (Gelderland)
Het Bildt (Friesland)
Bommelerwaard (Gelderland)
Brabantse Biesbosch (North Brabant)
Brabantse Stedenrij (North Brabant)
Brabantse Wal (North Brabant)

D
Delfland (South Holland)
Dokkumer Wouden (Friesland)
Drechtsteden (South Holland)
Duurswold (Groningen)

E
Eemland (Utrecht)
Eemvallei (Utrecht)
Eiland van Dordrecht (South Holland)
Ellertsveld (Drenthe)

F
Fivelingo (Groningen)
Flevopolder (Flevoland)
Friese Wouden (Friesland)

G
Gaasterland (Friesland)
Goeree-Overflakkee (South Holland)
Gooi (North Holland)
Gorecht (Groningen)
De Graafschap (Gelderland)
Graetheide (Limburg)
Groninger Veenkoloniën (Groningen)

H

Haarlemmermeer (North Holland)
Halfambt (Groningen)
Heuvelland (Limburg)
Hoeksche Waard (South Holland)
Hollandse Biesbosch (South Holland)
Hogeland (Groningen)
Humsterland (Groningen)
Hunsingo (Groningen)

I
IJsselmonde (South Holland)
IJsseldal (IJsselvallei) (Gelderland)
Innersdijken (Groningen)

K

Kampereiland (Overijssel)
Kanaalstreek (Groningen)
Kennemerland (North Holland)
Kleistreek (Friesland)
Kop van Noord-Holland  (North Holland)
Kop van Overijssel (Overijssel)
Krimpenerwaard (South Holland)

L
Land van Altena (North Brabant)
Land van Cuijk (North Brabant)
Land van Heusden (North Brabant)
Land van Heusden en Altena (North Brabant)
Land van Maas en Waal (Gelderland)
Langewold (Groningen)
Langstraat (North Brabant)
Liemers (Gelderland)
Lopikerwaard (Utrecht)

M

Maasland (North Brabant) (North Brabant)
Maasplassen (Limburg)
Marne (Groningen)
Marnewaard (Groningen)
Meierij van 's-Hertogenbosch (North Brabant)
Menterne (Groningen)
Mergelland (Limburg)
Middag (Groningen)
Midden-Limburg (Limburg)
Midden-Zeeland (Zeeland)
Middenveld (Drenthe)
Montferland (Gelderland)

N
Neder-Betuwe (Gelderland)
Noord-Beveland (Zeeland)
Noordenveld (Drenthe)
Noordoostpolder (Flevoland)

O

Oldambt (Groningen)
Ommelanden (Groningen)
Oostelijk Flevoland (Flevoland)
Oostelijke Mijnstreek (Limburg)
Oosterambt (Groningen)
Oostergo (Friesland)
Oostermoer (Drenthe)
Over-Betuwe (Gelderland)

P
Plateau van Margraten (Limburg)
Prins Alexanderpolder (South Holland)
Purmer (North Holland)

R

Reiderland (Groningen)
Rijk van Nijmegen (Gelderland)
Rijnmond (South Holland)
Rivierenland [nl] (Gelderland)
Rolderdingspel (Drenthe)
Rottumeroog (Groningen)
Rottumerplaat (Groningen)

S

Salland (Overijssel)
Schermer (North Holland)
Schieland (South Holland)
Schiermonnikoog (Friesland)
Schouwen-Duiveland (Zeeland)
Sint Philipsland (Zeeland)
South Beveland (Zeeland)
South Limburg (Limburg)
Southern Flevoland (Flevoland)
Stellingwerven (Friesland)
Stichtse Lustwarande (Utrecht)
De Streek (North Holland)

T

Terschelling (Friesland)
Texel (North Holland)
Tielerwaard (Gelderland)
Tiengemeten (South Holland)
Tholen (Zeeland)
Twente (Overijssel)

U
Upgo (Groningen)

V

Veluwe (Gelderland)
Vlieland (Friesland)
Voorne-Putten (South Holland)
Vredewold (Groningen)

W
Walcheren (Zeeland)
Waterland (North Holland)
West-Friesland (North Holland)
Westelijke Mijnstreek (Limburg)
Westergo (Friesland)
Westerkwartier (Groningen)
Westerlauwers Friesland (Friesland)
Westerwolde (Groningen)
Westland (South Holland)
Wieringen (North Holland)
Wieringermeer (North Holland)
Wijdewormer (De Wormer) (North Holland)

Z

Zaanstreek (North Holland)
Zeelandic Flanders (Zeeland)
Zevenwouden (Friesland)
Zoom (North Brabant)
Zuidenveld (Drenthe)
Zuiderduintjes (Groningen)
Zuidplaspolder (South Holland)
Zuidwesthoek (Friesland)
Zwijndrechtse Waard (South Holland)

References

 
Regions